Brigden may refer to:

People 
 Beatrice Brigden (1888–1977), Canadian social reformer
 Jim Brigden (1887–1950), Australian public servant
 Susan Brigden (born 1951), British historian
 Wallace Brigden (1916–2008), British cardiologist
 William Brigden (1916–2005), Canadian sprint canoer
 Zachariah Brigden (1734–1787), American silversmith
 Rachel Brigden (1991–), Typewriter enthusiast

Places 
 Brigden, Ontario